Aleksei Vladimirovich Kocharygin (born 17 February 1976) is a former Russian professional football player.

Club career
He played 3 seasons in the Russian Football National League for FC Tyumen, FC Shinnik Yaroslavl and FC Khimki.

References

1976 births
Footballers from Moscow
Living people
Russian footballers
Association football forwards
FC Tyumen players
FC Shinnik Yaroslavl players
FC Khimki players
FC Khimik Dzerzhinsk players
FC Spartak-2 Moscow players